David Eisner is an American business and political official. As of 2013, he is serving as president and CEO of Repair the World, a non-profit organization that fosters and mobilizes Jewish-American volunteerism efforts. Eisner was chief executive officer (CEO) of the Corporation for National and Community Service under George W. Bush until December 2008.

From 1997 until 2003, Eisner was a vice-president at AOL Time Warner. He was in charge of the company's charitable foundation. Other previous posts include acting as a senior vice president of Fleishman-Hillard International Communications and managing public relations at the Legal Services Corporation.  He also served as press secretary for three Members of Congress. Eisner has also served on the boards of several national nonprofit organizations.

Eisner recently served as president and CEO of the National Constitution Center, a post he held from November 2009 to October 31, 2012.  Eisner was the third CEO of the center since its opening in 2003.

Eisner became President & CEO of Convergence Center for Policy Resolution in April 2020 where he leads the organization's efforts to convene individuals and organizations with divergent views to build trust, identify solutions, and form alliances for action on critical national issues.

Eisner graduated from Stanford University and received his law degree from Georgetown University Law Center.  He lives with his family in Philadelphia, Pennsylvania.

References

Sources 
Official White House profile (archived)

American nonprofit chief executives
Living people
Year of birth missing (living people)
Stanford University alumni
Georgetown University Law Center alumni
CEOs of the Corporation for National and Community Service